The Hôtel Goblet d'Alviella is a hôtel particulier designed by Octave van Rysselberghe on the / in Saint-Gilles, Brussels, Belgium. It is the first major realization by Van Rysselberghe, who himself lived here until 1888. After that, the client, Count Eugène Goblet d'Alviella, professor, liberal member of parliament and freemason, moved in.

History
The building, with a strong Renaissance influence, was built in 1882 and is decorated with sgraffiti. It was the first time these were applied on a large scale in Brussels. They were drawn by sculptor Julien Dillens and executed by architect Jean Baes. The sgrafitti are four. Under the entablature of the two large windows, each has a narrow acanthus motif. Above it, a water-themed frieze depicts Triton and a siren surrounded by dolphins and putti. Between the columns is an allegory of architecture (plumb in hand and foot resting on a piece of Ionic column). The medallion between the windows is by Dillens and represents Minerva. The text τεχνων εραστρια means 'she who loves art'.

Under the cornice is a Venetian loggia. Between the columns are six blue tinted stained glass windows with geometric motifs.

The building is currently occupied by a private school.

Gallery

References

External links
 
Hôtel Goblet d'Alviella at monument.heritage.brussels

Houses in Belgium
City of Brussels
Octave van Rysselberghe buildings
Houses completed in 1882